Ceranisus is a genus of hymenopteran insects of the family Eulophidae. They are parasitoids of thrips of the order Thysanoptera and may be important in their biological control.

Species
 Ceranisus amanosus Doganlar, Gumovsky and Doganlar, 2009
 Ceranisus americensis (Girault, 1917)
 Ceranisus antalyacus Triapitsyn, 2004
 Ceranisus atcanacus (Doganlar and Doganlar, 2013)
 Ceranisus barsoomensis Triapitsyn, 2005
 Ceranisus bozovaensis (Doganlar, 2003) 
 Ceranisus femoratus (Gahan, 1932)
 Ceranisus filizinancae (Doganlar and Doganlar, 2014)
 Ceranisus hirsutus Doganlar and Triapitsyn, 2007
 Ceranisus hoddlei Triapitsyn & Morse, 2005
 Ceranisus jabanitarlensis Doganlar, Gumovsky and Doganlar, 2011 
 Ceranisus javae (Girault, 1917) 
 Ceranisus karacadagi (Doganlar and Doganlar, 2013) 
 Ceranisus karkamisus (Doganlar and Doganlar, 2013) 
 Ceranisus kemalae (Doganlar and Doganlar, 2014) 
 Ceranisus kirimensis (Doganlar and Doganlar, 2014) 
 Ceranisus kocaki (Doganlar and Doganlar, 2014) 
 Ceranisus komurcukurus (Doganlar and Doganlar, 2013) 
 Ceranisus lepidotus Graham, 1963
 Ceranisus loomansi Triapitsyn and Headrick, 1995
 Ceranisus menes (Walker, 1839) 
 Ceranisus nigricornis Motschulsky, 1863 
 Ceranisus nigrifemora De Santis, 1961 
 Ceranisus nizipus (Doganlar and Doganlar, 2013) 
 Ceranisus oezdikmeni (Doganlar and Doganlar, 2014) 
 Ceranisus oguzeliensis (Doganlar and Doganlar, 2013) 
 Ceranisus onuri Doganlar, 2010 
 Ceranisus pacuvius (Walker, 1838) 
 Ceranisus planitianus Erdös, 1966 
 Ceranisus rubensteina (Girault, 1934) 
 Ceranisus russelli (Crawford, 1911) 
 Ceranisus sekilinensis (Doganlar and Doganlar, 2013) 
 Ceranisus semitestaceus Motschulsky, 1863 
 Ceranisus sincanus (Doganlar and Doganlar, 2013) 
 Ceranisus udnamtak Triapitsyn, 2005 
 Ceranisus ukrainensis Doganlar, Gumovsky and Doganlar, 2011 
 Ceranisus votetoda Triapitsyn, 2005

References

 Key to Nearctic eulophid genera
 Universal Chalcidoidea Database

Eulophidae